The Bjargtangar Lighthouse (regionally also ) is a lighthouse located on the cliffs of Látrabjarg in northwestern Iceland.  It marks the westernmost point of Iceland and is the westernmost building of Europe.

History and description 
The Bjargtangar Light Station was established in 1913. The present tower was built in 1948. It is two stories high, built of concrete, and painted entirely white. The lantern house is on the second floor and faces the sea. The site (but not the tower) is open to visitors, although access is difficult.

See also 

 List of lighthouses in Iceland

Notes 

Lighthouses completed in 1913
Lighthouses completed in 1948
Lighthouses in Iceland
Buildings and structures in Westfjords
1913 establishments in Iceland